Dilendra Prasad Badu is a Nepalese politician who has served as the Minister for Law, Justice and Parliamentary Affairs of Nepal since 2021. Elected through proportional election system, he is currently serving as a Member of Parliament in the House of Representatives, Nepal from Darchula and he is currently in its Parliamentary Committee for State Affairs and Good Governance.  Before this, he was elected to the Pratinidhi Sabha in the 1999 election on behalf of the Nepali Congress.

D. P. Badu is member of central working committee for Nepali Congress since 2003, 2 tenure as appointed and 2 tenure elected. He also served as spokesperson of the party from 2010 to 2016. He has been Member of Parliament for times and minister for 3 times so far.

He started active politics in 1989, as a secretary of Nepali Congress, District Committee, Darchula. Before coming into active politics, he worked as a teacher in secondary school of Darchula (1977-1979), and as a faculty member and campus chief for Mahendra Multiple Campus, Nepalgunj, Banke, Tribhuvan University (1981-1990).

In the 2022 Nepalese general election, he was elected as the member of the 2nd Federal Parliament of Nepal.

References

Living people
Nepali Congress politicians from Sudurpashchim Province
Information and Communications ministers of Nepal
Nepal MPs 2017–2022
Nepal MPs 1999–2002
Nepal MPs 1991–1994
1954 births
Nepal MPs 2022–present